USS Seawolf may refer to:

 , renamed  before launching, was the lead ship of the H-class of submarine. Commissioned in 1913, she ran aground and sank in 1920
Commissioned in 1939, she was successful during World War II until she was lost to friendly fire in 1944
  was the second nuclear submarine. She was  commissioned in 1957 and stricken in 1987
  is the lead ship of her class. She was commissioned in 1997 and is currently in active service

See also
 , including the SSN-21
 Seawolf (disambiguation)

United States Navy ship names